Leonid Maksimovich Rakovshchik (born 2 November 1938) is a retired Russian rower who had his best achievements in the coxed pairs, together with Nikolay Safronov and Igor Rudakov. In this event they won two European medals in 1964 and 1965 and finished fourth at the 1964 Summer Olympics. His wife Tatyana Markvo also competed internationally in rowing.

References

1938 births
Living people
Olympic rowers of the Soviet Union
Rowers at the 1964 Summer Olympics
Soviet male rowers
Russian male rowers
European Rowing Championships medalists